Savage Sam may refer to:
 Savage Sam (novel), a 1962 children's novel by Fred Gipson
 Savage Sam (film), a 1963 film based on the novel